Tobin Im(born Jan 7, 1961) is a scholar of public administration and a professor at the Graduate School of Public Administration at Seoul National University. He specializes in public management, organization theory, and comparative administration.

Career 
Im received his B.A. and M.P.A. from Seoul National University in 1983 and 1985. He completed his Ph.D. at the l'Institut d'Études Politiques de Paris (Sciences-Po), earning his sociology doctorate in 1993. He joined the Seoul National Univ. faculty in 1999. He was a visiting professor at the George Washington University (2000), Chinese Young Men's College (2001), University of Otago (2002), l'Institut d'Études Politiques de Paris (2005), Indiana University-Purdue University Indianapolis (2006). and George Mason University(2012). In 2015, he served as president of Korean Association of Public Administration, for which now he is a chief editor since 2019. He is also an editor of Journal of Public Administration Research and Theory and Public Performance & Management Review. 
The American Review of Public Administration conferred its annual Best ARPA Article award to Alfred Tat-Kei Ho and Tobin Im for "Challenges in Building Effective and Competitive Government in Developing Countries: An Institutional Logics Perspective." in 2016. He received the Best Researcher Award in Seoul National University in 2017

Tobin Im has become Dean of Graduate School of Public Administration (GSPA) at Seoul National University in 2018. The Ministry of Education awarded him Outstanding Performance Award for Academic Support Project for "The Two Sides of Korean Administrative Culture: Competitiveness or Collectivism?"
GSPA ranks 11th in QS World University Rankings Social Policy & Administration in 2021.

Research interest 
Im is currently studying government competitiveness, winning research grant by Korea Research Foundation. He creates a new concept, government competitiveness, which has been interchangeably used with a host of similar concepts, such as national competitiveness, government efficiency, and government effectiveness. Im serves as director of Center for Government Competitiveness developing a GC indicator which makes cross-national analyses available.

Publications

References

External links
Tobin Im’s faculty profile at Seoul National University
2015 International Conference of KAPA (Korean Association of Public Administration)

1961 births
Seoul National University alumni
People from Seoul
Living people